Village Vets Australia is an Australian television series starring veterinarians Anthony Bennett and James Carroll. The first series premiered on LifeStyle on 24 July 2014. The second series began airing on 30 July 2015. It is produced by Screentime.

The series was nominated for an award at the 15th Screen Producers Australia Awards.

Episodes

Series 1 (2014)

Series 2 (2015)

Books 
Anthony Bennett and James Carroll went on to write two books, Village Vets and Calving Straps and Zombie Cats, co-authored with writer Mark Whittaker.

References

2014 Australian television series debuts
Australian non-fiction television series
Lifestyle (Australian TV channel) original programming
Television series by Screentime